Cotton Fort was a small fortification in Melcombe, now part of the town of Weymouth, Dorset. No trace of the fort exists today.

History
The fort was likely constructed during the reign of Henry VIII of England, although others suggest it may be Elizabethan. It took the form of a rampart, with three cannon mounted. It was constructed to the north of Melcombe, which these days is south of Weymouth railway station, but a lack of detail makes it impossible to trace the exact location.

See also
Block House (Melcombe)
Nothe Fort

References

Forts in Dorset
Buildings and structures in Weymouth, Dorset
History of Weymouth, Dorset
Former castles in England